{{Taxobox
| name = Arcobacter skirrowii
| domain = Bacteria
| phylum = Campylobacterota
| classis = "Campylobacteria"
| ordo = Campylobacterales
| familia = Arcobacteraceae
| genus = Arcobacter
| species = Arcobacter skirrowii
| species_authority = Vandamme et al., 1992
}}Arcobacter skirrowii'' is a species of bacteria. It can be pathogenic.

References

Further reading

Oyarzabal, O., et al. "Genomic variation of Arcobacter skirrowii determined by pulsed-field-gel electrophoresis." Meeting Abstract.

External links

LPSN
Type strain of Arcobacter skirrowii at BacDive -  the Bacterial Diversity Metadatabase

Gram-negative bacteria
Bacteria described in 1992